The following television stations broadcast on digital or analog channel 29 in Canada:

 CFCN-DT in Calgary, Alberta
 CFTF-DT in Rivière-du-Loup, Quebec
 CFTU-DT in Montreal, Quebec
 CHNM-DT-1 in Victoria, British Columbia
 CIFG-DT in Prince George, British Columbia
 CIII-DT-29 in Sarnia-Oil Springs, Ontario
 CKCW-DT in Moncton, New Brunswick

29 TV stations in Canada